The Indian boar (Sus scrofa cristatus), also known as the Andamanese pig or Moupin pig, is a subspecies of wild boar native to India, Nepal, Myanmar, western Thailand, and Sri Lanka

The Indian boar differs from its European counterpart by its large mane which runs in a crest along its back from its head to lower body, larger, more sharply featured and straighter skull, its smaller, sharper ears and overall lighter build. It is taller and more sparsely haired than the European form, though its back bristles are much more developed. The tail is also more tufted, and the cheeks hairier.

The animal has interacted with humans in India since at least the Upper Paleolithic, with the oldest depiction being a cave painting in Bhimbetaka, and it occasionally appears in Vedic mythology. A story present in the Brāhmaṇas has Indra slaying an avaricious boar, who has stolen the treasure of the asuras, then giving its carcass to Vishnu, who offers it as a sacrifice to the gods. In the story in Vedic Hindu mythology, the boar is an avatar of Brahma and has raised the earth from the primeval waters during creation. In the Rāmāyaṇa, Mahabharata and the Purāṇas, another boar (Varaha) is an avatar of Vishnu that kills Hiranyaksha and saves Bhumi.

See also 
Wild boar

References

External links

Mammals described in 1839
Suidae
Mammals of India
Mammals of Nepal
Mammals of Myanmar
Mammals of Thailand
Mammals of Sri Lanka
Wild boars